Southern Pines station is a train station located in Southern Pines, North Carolina, served by Amtrak's  train. The street address is 235 Northwest Broad Street, and is located in the heart of historic downtown Southern Pines. The station was originally built by a predecessor of the Seaboard Air Line Railroad in 1898, renovated in 1948, and restored to its 1948 design in 2004.

There is no Amtrak ticket office at this station, but there is "Quik-Trak" machine for automated ticketing.

References

External links 

Southern Pines Station – NC By Train
Southern Pines Amtrak Station (USA Rail Guide -- Train Web)

Buildings and structures in Moore County, North Carolina
Amtrak stations in North Carolina
S
Transportation in Moore County, North Carolina
Railway stations in the United States opened in 1898
1898 establishments in North Carolina